Dorothea Maetzel-Johannsen (6 February 1886 – 8 February 1930) was a German avant-garde painter.

Biography 
Dorothea Johannsen was born in Lensahn. She went to Hamburg trade school for girls. She was a teacher in Schleswig until 1910 when she married the Hamburg architect and painter :de:Emil Maetzel. As a married woman, she was no longer allowed to work as a teacher in the Wilhelminian Empire and had to give up the job.

She gave birth to four children: Ruth 1911, Bogumil 1913, Peter 1915, and Monika 1917.

Maetzel-Johannsen died in Hamburg on February 8, 1930, at the age of 44 years after an operation for heart weakness. A gravestone for Dorothea Maetzel-Johannsen and her husband is located in the Ohlsdorf cemetery, Planquadrat S 12 (near Chapel 1).

Career
Between 1911 and 1918 Maetzel-Johannsen traveled repeatedly to Berlin. During the First World War she took classes from Lovis Corinth.  After the war, together with her husband, Maetzel-Johannsen was one of the co-founders of the Hamburg Secession.

In 1921, Maetzel-Johannsen moved into her own studio in Hamburg. Here works were made, in which she emphasized the surface effect of the paintings more strongly.  At the same time she was concerned with the New Objectivity, which began to spread throughout Germany in the mid-1920s.

In 1923 she commissioned the painting for wall paintings in the Kunsthalle Hamburg.  In 1925 she stayed in Paris and Chartres for six months. In France, she took a variety of new ideas for her work back to Germany, which should be used in the last five years of her work.

In 1930, Maetzel-Johannsen worked on a commissioned design for a ceiling painting in the Hamburg Planetarium, but she died before the design could be executed.

Exhibitions
1926 Joint exhibition with the sculptor Friedrich Wield, Hamburger Kunsthalle 
1958 "Emil Maetzel - Dorothea Maetzel-Johannsen", Kunstverein Hamburg 
2016 Community exhibition.  Empathy and abstraction.  The Modernity of Women in Germany;  Bielefeld Arts Hall

Gallery

See also
 List of German women artists

References 

http://www.blouinartinfo.com/artists/dorothea-maetzel-johannsen-114621
Some content is translated from the existing German Wikipedia article at :de:Dorothea Maetzel-Johannsen; see its history for attribution.

1886 births
1930 deaths
19th-century German women artists
20th-century German women artists
20th-century German painters
19th-century German painters
German women painters